Thunder Bay is a Canadian documentary television series, premiering February 17, 2023 on Crave. Adapted from Ryan McMahon's 2018 Canadaland podcast Thunder Bay, the series will explore the deaths of indigenous teenagers in Thunder Bay, Ontario.

References

2020s Canadian documentary television series
2023 Canadian television series debuts
First Nations television series
Crave original programming
Television shows based on podcasts
Television shows filmed in Ontario
Culture of Thunder Bay